Bak Wol-ja (박월자, born 30 June 1944) is a North Korean speed skater.  She competed in the women's 3000 metres at the 1964 Winter Olympics.

References

External links
 

1944 births
Living people
North Korean female speed skaters
Olympic speed skaters of North Korea
Speed skaters at the 1964 Winter Olympics